Zielątkowo may refer to the following places:
Zielątkowo, Greater Poland Voivodeship (west-central Poland)
Zielątkowo, Lubusz Voivodeship (west Poland)
Zielątkowo, Człuchów County in Pomeranian Voivodeship (north Poland)